Arthur Leonard Treble (8 October 1889 – 1 September 1966) was a British track and field athlete who competed in the 1912 Summer Olympics in Stockholm, Sweden. He was born in Chichester.

In 1912 he was eliminated in the first round of the 5000 metres event.

He died on 1 September 1966, at age 76, in Newtown, Connecticut, United States.

References

External links
Arthur Treble's profile at Sports Reference.com

1889 births
1966 deaths
Sportspeople from Chichester
English male long-distance runners
Olympic athletes of Great Britain
Athletes (track and field) at the 1912 Summer Olympics